Thomas G. Goodwillie (born 1954) is an American mathematician and professor at Brown University who has made fundamental contributions to algebraic and geometric topology. He is especially famous for developing the concept of calculus of functors, often also named Goodwillie calculus.

Life 
While studying at Harvard University, Goodwillie became a Putnam Fellow in 1974 and 1975. He then studied at Princeton University, where he completed his PhD at in 1982, under the supervision of Wu-Chung Hsiang. He returned to Harvard as Junior Fellow in 1979, and was an associate professor (without tenure) at Harvard from 1982 to 1987. In 1987 he was hired with tenure by Brown University, where he was promoted to full professor in 1991.

He developed the calculus of functors in a series of three papers in the 1990s and 2000s, which has since been expanded and applied in a number of areas, including the theory of smooth manifolds, algebraic K-theory, and homotopy theory.

He has advised 11 PhD students.

Goodwillie is interested in issues of racial and gender equality and has taught a course on this topic. He is an active user on MathOverflow.

Recognition 
Goodwillie received a Sloan Fellowship and the Harriet S. Sheridan Award. He is a Fellow of the American Mathematical Society.

A conference with leading topologists as speakers was organized on the occasion of his 60th birthday.

References

External links
Website at Brown University

Topologists
20th-century American mathematicians
21st-century American mathematicians
Harvard University alumni
Princeton University alumni
Harvard University faculty
Brown University faculty
1954 births
Living people
Fellows of the American Mathematical Society
Putnam Fellows